Brunsbach is a small river of North Rhine-Westphalia, Germany. It is a left tributary of the Wupper in Hückeswagen. The Weierbach river is a tributary of the Brunsbach.

See also
List of rivers of North Rhine-Westphalia

References

Rivers of North Rhine-Westphalia
Rivers of Germany